Wiedenmeyeria is a monotypic genus of South American wandering spiders containing the single species, Wiedenmeyeria falconensis. It was first described by E. Schenkel in 1953, and has only been found in Venezuela.

References

Ctenidae
Invertebrates of Venezuela
Monotypic Araneomorphae genera
Spiders of South America